"The Only Unavoidable Subject of Regret": George Washington, Slavery and the Enslaved Community at Mount Vernon is a scholarly book on the history of slavery at Mount Vernon during the times of George Washington. Written by Mary V. Thompson, the book was published in the United States in 2019.

Background
Thompson stated that she had worked on the book for "about thirty years, although for a lot of that time, it didn't know that it wanted to be a book."

Topics covered
Thompson's book contains major chapters that focus on topics that include George Washington and Martha Washington as slave owners; George Washington's changes in views about slavery over time; supervisors of slaves who were hired, indentured, or enslaved; family life in Mount Vernon's slave community; the slaves' quarters; the slaves' diets; slaves' recreation and private enterprise; and control and resistance and among Mount Vernon's slaves.

Reviews and influence
Reviews have appeared in the London Review of Books, the Journal of Social History, the Washington Independent Review of Books, The Virginia Magazine of History and Biography, the Journal of the American Revolution, and Choice.

In the London Review of Books, Eric Foner wrote that 

In the Washington Independent Review of Books, Henry Wiencek wrote that

Editions
The book was published by in 2019 by University of Virginia Press:

References

2019 non-fiction books
Books about George Washington
American history books
English-language books
University of Virginia Press books
Non-fiction books about American slavery